Javier Goñi Lopéz (born 12 April 1986 in Madrid) is a vision impaired S11/B1 swimmer from Spain. He competed at the 2004 Summer Paralympics in Athens, Greece, winning a silver medal in the 100 meter backstroke race.

References

External links 
 
 

Living people
1986 births
Spanish male backstroke swimmers
Paralympic silver medalists for Spain
Swimmers from Madrid
Swimmers at the 2004 Summer Paralympics
Paralympic medalists in swimming
Medalists at the 2004 Summer Paralympics
Paralympic swimmers of Spain